A kuguaglycoside is one of several chemical compounds (cucurbitane triterpenoid glycosides) isolated from the roots of the bitter melon vine (Momordica charantia, kǔguā in Chinese) by J.-C. Chen and others.

Kuguaglycosides are glycosides of triterpene derivatives, with the cucurbitane skeleton. They are colorless solids, soluble in methanol, ethyl acetate, and butanol. They include:

 Kuguaglycoside A: 3β-hydroxy-7β-methoxycucurbita-5,24-dien-23-yl β-glucopyranoside, 
 Kuguaglycoside B: 3β-hydroxy-25-methoxycucurbita-5,23-dien-7β-yl β-glucopyranoside, 
 Kuguaglycoside C: 7β-(β-glucopyranosyloxy)-3β-hydroxycucurbita-5,23,25-trien-19-al,  (colorless needles)
 Kuguaglycoside D: 3β,19,23-trihydroxycucurbita-5,24-dien-7β-yl β-glucopyranoside, 
 Kuguaglycoside E: 23-(β-glucopyranosyloxy)-3β,19-dihydroxycucurbita-5,24-dien-7β-yl β-glucopyranoside, 
 Kuguaglycoside F: 23-(β-glucopyranosyloxy)-7β-methoxycucurbita-5,24-dien-3β-yl β-allopyranoside, 
 Kuguaglycoside G: 23-(β-glucopyranosyloxy)-3β-hydroxycucurbita-5,24-dien-7β-yl β-glucopyranoside, 
 Kuguaglycoside H: 23-(β-glucopyranosyl(1→2)-β-glucopyranosyl)-3β-hydroxycucurbita-5,24-dien-7β-yl β-glucopyranoside,  (colorless needles)

Kuguaglycoside B is also found in the fruit of M. charantia.

References 

Triterpene glycosides